Philippine Cultural College (abbreviated as PCC) is a Chinese Filipino school with three campuses located in Manila, Caloocan and Quezon City, Metro Manila, Philippines, established on June 27, 1923 by the Philippine Chinese Educational Association. PCC is the oldest Chinese Filipino secondary school in the Philippines. It is a non-stock, non-profit, and non-sectarian co-educational education institution offering pre-school, and has a Level II re-accredited status from the Philippine Accrediting Association of Schools, Colleges and Universities (PAASCU) for its grade school and high school. Its programs emphasize in the English, Filipino, and Mandarin Chinese languages, Mathematics, Science, and Information Technology.

School History

The Pioneering Stage
The school was originally named Philippine Chinese High School. It was established by the Philippine Chinese Educational Association in 1923, under the leadership of Don Carlos Palanca Sr. With 47 students, classes were first held using the two classrooms of Anglo Chinese School (now Tiong Se Academy). Classes started on June 27, thus the date became the foundation day of the school. In 1937, the first batch of alumni organized the PCHS Alumni Association, with Mr. Go Seng Guan elected as the first president. He was succeeded by Mr. Kong Kuan. In 1938, the school was authorized by the Educational Association to organize a board of trustees which would take over the management of the school. Mr. Go Chong Beng was the first chairman of the board. For 15 years, Mr. Chow Cing Chian, Mr. Tsai Xiang Chang, Mr. Tiu See Eng, Mr. King She Hiong, Mr. Shu Seng Shan, and Mr. Huang Meng Kuei served as school principal one after another.

Surmounting Difficulties
In 1939, Teng Chiu Huang served as the 7th school principal.
In 1940, a new school building was constructed along Jose Abad Santos Street. Classes were held both at the new building and at the old building of Anglo Chinese School.
In January 1942, the Imperial Japanese Army invaded the City of Manila. The new school building was forcibly occupied by the Japanese troops. Classes were suspended.
In May 1945, the school was the first one within the city to reopen after the war.
In 1948, expansion of the Abad Santos school building was completed. The old school building was turned over to Anglo Chinese School.

On May 2, 1949, at 11:30 in the evening, a neighborhood fire brought disaster to the school. The whole school building, together with all the important records and papers, and facilities were burned to ashes.     
            
Under the leadership of T.C. Huang and Sy Eng, the president of the Educational Association and at the same time the chairman of the board of trustees, efforts were exerted and donations from various sectors of the Chinese community were gathered. On November 11 of that same year, a new school building was finally completed.

The Struggling Years
On November 11, 1960, T.C. Huang died after serving as the principal for 20 years.  On December 8 of that same year, the Board of Trustees appointed Go Seng Guan as the principal.

In 1961, using the funds from Dr. T. C. Huang Memorial Foundation, the school bought a 10,000 square meter Caloocan Campus property in Caloocan.

On November 8, 1963, Sy Eng, the chairman of the board of trustees, died. Chung Tiong Tay succeeded him.

In 1967, the Department of Education approved the construction of an Caloocan campus in Caloocan. Classes were held in June of that same year, with more than 300 students.

In 1976, the government Filipinized all Chinese schools in the Philippines. The school was renamed Philippine Cultural High School.

Since its founding, Philippine Cultural High School used to offer only high school education. But with the changing of times, both the Manila and the Caloocan campuses started offering pre-school and elementary education during the 70s.

The activities of the Alumni Association were suspended due to the uncertainty of times. PCHS Alumni Coordinating Committee, with Marcos Chua as the liaison officer, was organized instead to help contact alumni from all places. In 1976, the Alumni Association was re-organized, with Chuang Chong Chian as the president.

In 1978, the Alumni Association successfully assisted the Board of Trustees in the fund raising campaign for the expansion project of the Caloocan campus.

Development Stage
In the 1980s, the Board of Trustees, the Alumni Association, and the school authorities realized the imperative need for further development in order to meet the demands of the changing times. Taking the suggestion of the principal, Mr. Go Seng Guan, the reconstruction of the school building in the Manila campus started under the leadership of Mr. Chung Tiong Tay, the chairman of the board of trustees. After five years of patience and hardwork, a towering new school building proudly stood along Jose Abad Santos Street.

On January 11, 1986, while the construction of the main school building was on its peak, Mr. Go Seng Guan died. He was 80 years old. He served the school for 50 years.
In that same year, the Board of Trustees appointed Dr. Fernando Gan as the 9th principal of the school. Mr. Emilio Gan was appointed assistant principal of Manila Campus while Ms. Susana Bairan was appointed as the assistant principal of the Caloocan Campus respectively.

In June 1988, the new school building in the Manila campus was inaugurated. To commemorate this event, the cultural show “An Odyssey” was staged. After the completion of the new school building, the president of the Alumni Association, Mr. John Tan, spearheaded the fund-raising campaign for the “PCHS Faculty and Staff Mutual Aid Fund”.

In 1989, the Board of Trustees organized the PCHS Educational Foundation to ensure the effective management of these endowments.
In 1989, Dr. Fernando Gan had to resign as principal because of failing health. The Board of Trustees promoted Mr. Emilio Gan as the 10th principal of the school. Ms. Susana Bairan remained the assistant principal.

In 1990, realizing that the quality of Chinese education had deteriorated, and that the instructional materials had become old and obsolete, Mr. Chung Tiong Tay, the chairman of the board, used his personal money to hire experts to revise and prepare instructional materials that would suit the needs of the local students. With this, Mr. Gan introduced “Teaching / Learning Chinese as a Secondary Language”, the latest pedagogy developed specifically for non-native speakers.

In 1991, spearheaded by the several members of the Board of Trustees and directors of the Alumni Association, the Philippine Chinese Education Research Center was established. It was tasked to promote reforms in the Chinese language teaching within the country. A 10-million peso seed fund was collected from the alumni and generous patrons.

To uplift the quality of education and improve the instructional facilities, our school applied for PAASCU. Both the Manila and the Caloocan campuses were granted Level II accreditation status for five years. After Dr. Chuang Chong Chian, the Alumni Association went under the leadership of Mr. Ang Cheng Tionsu, Ms. Bee Keng Elena Cu Uy Gam, Mr. John Tan, Ms. Mary Lim, Mr. Eduardo Chua, Ms. Pilar Ongking, Dr. Tan King King, Ms. Janet Kopio, Mr. Alfredo Lu, Mr. Peter Gaisano, Mr. Sy Uliong, Mr. Angel Tan and the incumbent Ms. Diana To. They have all contributed significantly to the alma mater and the Alumni Association.

After An Odyssey, the school came up with other equally remarkable performances, such as The Blooming Sunflowers (1990), D’ Little Twinkling Stars (1992), Salinlahi (1993), Pagdiriwang (1998), Tomorrow's Promise (2000), PCHS at 80 (2003), and The Golden Cradle (2005), and March On, PCHS (2008) etc.

In 1994, Ms. Susana Bairan, the assistant principal, retired from office. She had served the school untiringly for 27 years. Upon her retirement, she was appointed as a member of the board of trustees. At the same time, the Board of Trustees appointed Mr. Antonio O as the Officer-In-Charge (OIC) of the Caloocan campus. The Board of Trustees passed a resolution to construct a modern 4-story Kindergarten Building on the Caloocan campus.

In 1995, the Kinder Day Care was established.

In 1999, a Science Building was constructed on the Caloocan campus.

After more than 30 years of selfless dedication to his beloved alma mater, Mr. Chung retired as the chairman of the board of trustees in May 2000. Mr. John Tan succeeded him as the chairman of the board of trustees.

In 2001, Mr. Antonio O retired as the OIC of the Caloocan campus. The Board of Trustees appointed Ms. Yolanda Que as the administrative head of the Caloocan campus until 2008.

In 2002, Dr. Chuang Chong Chian succeeded Mr. John Tan as the chairman of the board of trustees. At the same time, the Board appointed Dr. Sining Marcos Kotah as the administrative head of the Manila campus, assisting the principal in taking charge of the Manila campus.

Aside from developing its curriculum, the school also established sister school relations with schools in China like Huaqiao University, Jin Jiang Nan Qiao Middle School, Shi Shi No. 8 Middle School, Shi Shi No. 3 Middle School, Shi Shi Experimental School, Qiao Sheng Middle School, Ying Lin Middle School, etc. Both parties have established a long term relation, interacting regularly, helping each other towards the continuous improvement of their educational standards.

In 2004, Mr. Eduardo Chua succeeded Dr. Chuang Chong Chian as the chairman of the board of trustees.

In 2006, Ms. Bee Keng Elena Cu Uy Gam succeeded Mr. Eduardo Chua, and became the first female chairman of the board of trustees. During her term, she started working on the application for the opening of the college department.

In 2008, Ms. Pilar Ongking succeeded Ms. Bee Keng Elena Cu Uy Gam as the chairman of the board of trustees. Mr. Emilio Gan, after 38 years of dedicated service to the school, retired from office. He was appointed as a member of the B.O.T. On the same year, the school opened its college and changed its name to Philippine Cultural College (PCC). At the same time, the school changed its organizational structure, with the president being the highest in office and a vice president each for the college and the basic education departments. Dr. Lily Go was named president of Philippine Cultural College and Dr. Sining M. Kotah as vice president of the secondary, elementary and kinder departments of both the Manila and the Caloocan campuses.

A new college building was proposed, to be constructed on a lot donated by Mr. Benito Cu and Ms. Elena Cu Uy Gam in Quezon City. Ground-breaking ceremony was held on January 15, 2012.

On the same year, Mr. Angel Tan succeeded Ms. Pilar Ongking as the chairman of the board of trustees.

In June 2013, there was a grand celebration to commemorate to celebrate the 90th anniversary of Philippine Cultural College.

School Campuses
Manila Campus: 1253 Jose Abad Santos Ave. Tondo, Manila. Contact number: (+63-2) 252-0501 to 03.
Caloocan Campus: 175 8th Ave. Extension, Grace Park, Caloocan. Contact number: (+63-2) 363-3529 and 364-3730.
Quezon City Campus: 46 M. Cuenco St., Cor. D. Tuazon St., Quezon City. Contact number: (+63-2) 252-0501 to 03 local 129.

School Programs
The basic education department offers two types of Kindergarten program. Both programs focus on the cognitive, social and psychomotor aspects of development of the child.

The Kinder – Regular program offers half-day classes for Pre-nursery, Nursery & Kinder I and whole   day   classes   for   Kinder II   while  our 
Kinder – Day Care program offers whole-day classes with sleeping time and lunch and afternoon snacks incorporated into their daily activities.

The Grade School and High School programs equip students with maximum functional literacy skills, tri-lingual fluency (Filipino, English and Chinese), and scientific, numerical and technological competence. The curriculum harmonizes the precepts of traditional Chinese education with modern trends in western pedagogy.

College Courses
Bachelor of Science in Hotel & Restaurant Management
Bachelor of Science in Tourism Management
Bachelor of Science in Business Administration 
Major in Human Resource Development
Major in Operations (Business) Management
Major in Marketing Management
Bachelor of Science in Information Technology
Bachelor of Secondary Education
Major in Teaching Chinese as a Second Language
Bachelor of Elementary Education
Major in Early Childhood Education

Accreditation
Its grade school and high school has a Level II re-accredited status from the Philippine Accrediting Association of Schools, Colleges and Universities (PAASCU).

References

External links
 Official Website
 Alumni Website
 PCERC reference
 June 27 2013 - Message of President Aquino to the Philippine Cultural College on the occasion of their 90th Founding Anniversary
 Memorandum of Agreement - PRC and RP

High schools in Metro Manila
Chinese-language schools in Metro Manila
Universities and colleges in Metro Manila
Education in Tondo, Manila
Education in Caloocan
Educational institutions established in 1923
1923 establishments in the Philippines